Nakhimovsky (masculine), Nakhimovskaya (feminine), or Nakhimovskoye (neuter) is the name of several rural localities in Russia:
Nakhimovskoye, Leningrad Oblast, a settlement under the administrative jurisdiction of Roshchinskoye Settlement Municipal Formation in Vyborgsky District of Leningrad Oblast; 
Nakhimovskoye, Smolensk Oblast, a selo in Nakhimovskoye Rural Settlement of Kholm-Zhirkovsky District in Smolensk Oblast